The 2020 Kwik Fit British Touring Car Championship (commonly abbreviated as BTCC) was a motor racing championship for production-based touring cars held across England and Scotland. The championship featured a mix of professional motor racing teams and privately funded amateur drivers competing in highly modified versions of family cars which are sold to the general public and conform to the technical regulations for the championship. The 2020 season was the 63rd British Touring Car Championship season and the tenth season for cars conforming to the Next Generation Touring Car (NGTC) technical specification. The Championship was won by Ashley Sutton.

Teams and drivers
All drivers competed under British racing licences.

Driver changes 
Entering/re-entering BTCC
 2019 Mini Challenge UK winner James Gornall debuted with TradePriceCars.com.
 Andy Neate returned to the series after having last raced in 2016 for Halfords Yuasa Racing, driving a third car for Motorbase Performance.
 Ollie Brown debuted with Team HARD.
 Jack Butel debuted for Ciceley Motorsport.
 Tom Onslow-Cole returned to the series after having last raced in 2013 for Team HARD and Airwaves Racing, rejoins Team HARD to replace Ollie Brown who was injured at Oulton Park.
Former Renault Clio Cup United Kingdom racer Jade Edwards debuted with Power Maxed Car Care Racing.
Rob Austin returned to the series after having last raced in 2018 for DUO Motorsport with HMS Racing, driving the car for Power Maxed Car Care Racing at Thruxton.
Four-time Renault Clio Cup UK champion Paul Rivett debuted with GKR TradePriceCars.com.
 Jac Constable was supposed to debut for Power Maxed Car Care Racing at Croft but withdrew from the race meeting on medical grounds.
 Jessica Hawkins debuted for Power Maxed Car Care Racing at Snetterton.
 Glynn Geddie returned to the series after having last raced in 2018 for AmD Essex.
 Bradley Philpot debuted for Power Maxed Car Care Racing at Brands Hatch.

Changed teams
 Ashley Sutton moved from Team BMR to Laser Tools Racing.
 Jake Hill moved from TradePriceCars.com to MB Motorsport.
 Bobby Thompson moved from Team HARD to TradePriceCars.com.
 Sam Osborne moved from Excelr8 Motorsport to MB Motorsport.
 Tom Chilton moved from Motorbase Performance to BTC Racing.
 Senna Proctor moved from Team BMR to Excelr8 Motorsport.
 Michael Crees moved from Team HARD to BTC Racing.
 Rory Butcher moved from AmDTuning.com to Motorbase Performance.
 Chris Smiley moved from BTC Racing to Excelr8 Motorsport.
 Nicolas Hamilton moved from Motorbase Performance to Team HARD.

Leaving BTCC
 Mark Blundell left the series to become sporting director of MB Motorsport.
 Rob Collard left the series to drive in the British GT Championship.
 Rob Smith left the series after losing his drive at Excelr8 Motorsport to Chris Smiley.
 Matt Simpson left the series to support his son's karting career.
 Daniel Rowbottom left the series after losing his drive at Ciceley Motorsport to Jack Butel.

Team changes 

 Subaru will not enter a manufacturer team in the series after their four-year agreement with Team BMR ended at the end of the 2019 season. Team BMR would rebrand as BMR Engineering to design cars for other teams. BMR Engineering later entered a technical partnership with Laser Tools Racing, which allowed them to expand to a two-car entry for 2020.
 Excelr8 Motorsport switched from running the MG6 GT to the Hyundai i30 Fastback N Performance.
 BTC Racing will expand from a two-car entry to a three-car entry for 2020.
 Team HARD. switched from running one of their Volkswagen CCs to an ex-West Surrey Racing BMW 125i M Sport.
 AmDTuning.com became Mark Blundell Motorsport with Mark Blundell as sporting director.
 Motorbase Performance switched from running the third generation Ford Focus RS to the newer fourth generation Ford Focus ST.

Changes related to the COVID-19 pandemic 

 Power Maxed Racing originally intended to enter the 2020 season as a works team, fielding two Vauxhall Astra cars for Jason Plato and Mat Jackson, but elected to take a sabbatical from the series due to the pandemic with a view to return in 2021. The team would later make a return to the series as an independent team from Oulton Park onwards, fielding a single Astra for drivers on one-off basis.
 Andrew Jordan withdrew from the series following funding issues caused as a result of the COVID-19 pandemic. Team BMW elected to not seek a replacement driver, and effectively slimed down from running three cars to running only two.
 Mike Bushell initially signed with Team HARD, but later withdrew from the series initially due to health issues and later as a result of the COVID-19 pandemic. Bushell later returned at the rounds at Oulton Park and Knockhill for Power Maxed Racing and at Croft he replaced Tom Onslow-Cole in Team HARD.
 Howard Fuller, who competed sporadically for Team HARD in the 2012 and 2013 BTCC Seasons, was initially hired to stand in for Bushell but was replaced by Ollie Brown by the time the delayed season started.

Race calendar 
The revised championship calendar was announced by the championship organisers on 27 April 2020. All races will be held in the United Kingdom. Original calendar was announced on 16 June 2019, but was revised due to the COVID-19 pandemic.

Rule changes

Technical changes 

 Goodyear is set to become the series' tyre supplier, replacing Dunlop. It will be the first time since the 2002 season that Dunlop does not supply the series with tyres.

Qualifying changes 

 A new qualifying format of one twenty-five-minute session and a second, ten-minute, qualifying session, in which the top ten in Q1 will set lap times, determining the first ten spaces on the grid. This will be trialled at Snetterton

Support series changes 

 The Renault UK Clio Cup, which has been part of the TOCA support package since 2000, will leave the BTCC support package and will instead support the British GT Championship. It will be replaced by the Mini Challenge.

 The new Porsche Sprint Challenge GB, made up of Porsche 718 Cayman GT4 Clubsport cars, will support the Silverstone National and Croft rounds.

Results

Championship standings

Notes
No driver may collect more than one point for leading a lap per race regardless of how many laps they lead.

Drivers' Championship

Manufacturers'/Constructors' Championship

Teams' Championship

Independent Drivers' Championship

Independent Teams' Championship

Jack Sears Trophy

Notes

References

External links 

 
 TouringCarTimes

British Touring Car Championship seasons
Touring Car Championship
British Touring Car Championship
British Touring Car Championship